Marc Catlin is a state representative from Montrose, Colorado. A Republican, Catlin represents Colorado House of Representatives District 58, which encompasses all of Montrose County, Montezuma County, San Miguel County,  and Dolores County in southwestern Colorado.

In late 2016, a vacancy committee appointed Catlin to serve as State Representative after his District 58 predecessor, Don Coram, resigned to fill a vacant seat in the Colorado State Senate. Catlin was sworn in as state representative in early January 2017.

Experience
Catlin also serves on the board of directors of the Colorado River District. From 1996 to 2011 he was the Manager of the Uncompahgre Valley Water Users Association.

References

External links
 State House website

21st-century American politicians
Living people
Republican Party members of the Colorado House of Representatives
People from Montrose, Colorado
Year of birth missing (living people)